The Volcano may refer to:

Any generic volcano
A monotone chant made popular by fans of the Iceland national football team.
Volcano, California, a community in northern California
The Volcano (British Columbia), a cinder cone in northwestern British Columbia, Canada
The Volcano (1919), a silent film directed by George Irving
 Al-Burkan (The Volcano), a Libyan exile dissident group in the 1980s
 The Volcano (nightclub), a former nightclub in Glasgow, Scotland.

See also 
 Volcano (disambiguation)